Smooth Island, is a privately owned island with an area of  lying close to the south-eastern coast of Tasmania, Australia. The island is part of the Sloping Island Group situated in Norfolk Bay and surrounded by the Tasman and Forestier Peninsulas. The towns Dunalley and Murdunna are nearby. Smooth Island differs from other Tasmanian islands as it has an unencumbered freehold title down to the high-water mark.

Administration
For administrative purposes, the island is within the Tasman Council, the land district of Pembroke, the legislative council of Rumney and the electorate of Lyons at state and federal levels. It lies within the Fire Management Area Committee Boundary (FMAC) of 'East Coast'.

Smooth Island is privately owned; it has a freehold title with no covenants. In 2014 Smooth Island was gazetted as a Private Forest Timber Reserve. The coast line  from the Smooth Island waterline has been classified Zone 23 (Environmental management) under the Tasman Interim Planning Scheme 2015.

Access 
Smooth island is private property to the coastal high-water mark; unauthorised public access, including mooring of vessels, is prohibited. Subject to authorisation, Smooth Island is easily accessible by boat and helicopter. The island's terrain is suited to the construction of a small airstrip.

Services 
The island receives radio coverage from ABC Local Radio (936 AM), 3G mobile phone coverage from Telstra and wireless coverage from the National Broadband Network. The table below outlines the nearest services and facilities to Smooth Island.

Recreational fishing
"All waters 200 metres seaward from the low water mark of Smooth Island: Shark Refuge Area. No taking of shark, skates or rays, except elephantfish. Where permitted, graball nets must not be set for more than 2 hours and can only be set from sunrise until one hour before sunset. No mullet nets. No set lines (ong lines and drop lines)."

Geography

The island has two hilly peaks separated by a saddle.

Climate
See here for live data from Smooth Island's Weather Station.

Geology

Smooth Island consists of diabase or dolerite rock, a subvolcanic intrusion that probably occurred from  during the Eocene epoch of the Cenozoic era. It was said to be similar to the sandstone samples retrieved from South Arm that contained numerous fossils but no fossils were found in the samples taken from Smooth Island. The western aspect of the island contains dolerite (tholeiitic) with locally developed granophyre from the Jurassic period. The water table is classified as a surficial sediment aquifer (porous media – unconsolidated).

Because the island predominantly has a sloping hard rock shore, there is little vulnerability to flooding or erosion due to a rise in sea level. A coastal acid sulfate soil analysis produced a result of "extremely low" along the north and north-east side of the island.

Ecosystem
See here for an overview of Smooth Island's fauna and flora.

Marine ecology 

Smooth Island is surrounded by a low-profile reef. A region of gravel or hard sand extends from the reef on the eastern coast towards King George Island and King George Sound. The reef on the western coast is surrounded by sand and a body of silt approaches the south-west coast of the island. Studies have found dense populations of South Australian cobbler (Gymnapistes marmoratus) within this region because this fish prefers patchy beds of eelgrass. The island's east coast has the densest concentration of Little weed whiting (Neoodax balteatus) in Norfolk Bay; an assessment in 1995–1996 revealed that 88% of the fish caught were of the species Little Rock Whiting (Neoodax balteatus) and Bridled Leatherjacket (Acanthaluteres spilomelanurus).

A species of red algae (Rhabdonia verticillata) has been found close to the island. The fish species flathead, trumpeter, perch, cod and Australian salmon can be found in the waters immediately surrounding the island. Dolphins are frequently sighted and killer whales (Orcinus orca) are infrequently sighted near the island. The Spotted handfish and the Live-bearing Seastar (Parvulastra vivipara) are threatened marine species that may be present in the waters surrounding Smooth Island. Several humpback whales were spotted near Smooth Island in June 2017.

Ecological rehabilitation
The terrestrial ecosystem of Smooth Island has been damaged by overgrazing and slashing-and-burning, and through the commercial hunting of wildlife. The island's natural vegetation has been largely displaced by exotic grass, thistle, bracken, scattered eucalypts and African boxthorn bushes. The island' current owners intend to systematically restore its native ecosystem. Since March 2014, a diverse range of native Tasmanian flora have been planted throughout the island. Remnant eucalypts are also expected to seed on the island's south-east coast since grazing has ceased.

History

Toponymy
Matthew Flinders discovered the island on 15 December 1798 and named it "Smooth Island" on his contemporaneous maps but the island does not appear on his 1814 map. In 1824 Thomas Scott referred to the island as "Garden Island" on his maps. The origins of this are not entirely clear, and other sources are inconclusive about the above assertions. and state that the island was first named on a map by "Cross (1830)" and "Frankland" (1837)", before stating several pages later that the island was first named "Smooth Island".

According to a 1911 newspaper article, the island "is not named in the map of D'Entrecasteaux, even though it was marked".  During the early 21st century, Smooth Island was occasionally listed as "Lot 1 Norfolk Bay, Dunalley TAS 7177" on some real-estate classifieds.

Much confusion exists about the names of many of the islands in South East Tasmania. Garden Island has become an alternative name for both Green Island and Smooth Island. A newspaper article from 1836 refers to a Garden Island in the Pembroke Land District.

Structures

A survey of Smooth Island was completed on 14 July 1863; it reveals the presence of the original jetty, a spring and a guano excavation site on the island. A lighthouse (K 3621.2) was installed on the north peak in 1991. It was relocated by request of the landowners in 2014.

Potential uses
Smooth Island's south and west coasts have alkaline soil while the east slope has acidic soil.
The crops with the greatest yield potential are as follows:
 Table wine grapes
 Sparkling wine grapes
 Industrial hemp
 Pyrethrum
 Blueberries
 Phosphate mining: on 13 October 1941, the viability of mining phosphate on Smooth Island was assessed but was determined to not be viable.

Artwork

Smooth Island has been the subject of two notable paintings: Michael Weitnauer's Norfolk Bay and Dale Frank's "Dunalley, Smooth Island". It has been mentioned in poems such as "Two Kinds of Silence" by Kathryn Lomer:
I could lose or find myself
in this private Bermuda triangle-
Connelly's Bay, Lime Bay, Smooth Island;

In the dusk Smooth Island's navigation light
begins to blink its code name
to sailors bound for Dunalley

Gallery

See also

 Weather station
 Aircraft traffic receiver
 Boat traffic receiver
 Biodiversity map

Footnotes

References

External links
 
 

 
Sloping Island Group
Island restoration
South East coast of Tasmania
Private islands of Tasmania
Articles containing video clips